Gílson Paulo de Mello Filho, (born 1 May 1949), simply known as Gílson Paulo, is a Brazilian football coach, who recently managed the national team of Equatorial Guinea, a position he took up on 1 January 2012.

Although his contract with Equatorial Guinea had a duration of two months, the victories of the national team in the 2012 Africa Cup of Nations against Libya and especially Senegal achieved that was extended to one year.

Career
Gílson Paulo had previously been a sports director at the academy of Brazilian club Vasco da Gama. where he was to return in mid-February.

References

1949 births
Living people
Sportspeople from Rio de Janeiro (city)
Brazilian football managers
Equatorial Guinea national football team managers
2012 Africa Cup of Nations managers